JaQuavian Jy'Quese "Quay" Walker (born May 8, 2000) is an American football inside linebacker for the Green Bay Packers of the National Football League (NFL). He played college football at Georgia and was drafted by the Packers in the first round of the 2022 NFL Draft.

Early life and high school
Walker was born on May 8, 2000, in Cordele, Georgia. He attended Crisp County High School, where he had 109 tackles, eight sacks, and an interception as a junior. Walker was rated a four-star recruit and initially committed to play college football at Alabama before his senior year in 2017, but changed to Georgia in early 2018.

College career
Walker played in all 14 of Georgia's games during his freshman season and had six total tackles. He saw increased playing time as a sophomore and finished the season with 23 tackles, 3.5 tackles for loss, and 2.5 sacks. Walker finished as Georgia's fourth-leading tackler with 43 in his junior season.

Professional career

Walker was drafted by the Green Bay Packers in the first round (22nd overall) of the 2022 NFL Draft. The Packers previously acquired the pick in a trade that sent Davante Adams to the Las Vegas Raiders. On May 6, 2022, he signed his rookie contract.

Walker was ejected in week 8 against the Buffalo Bills after an altercation with Bills' practice squad tight end Zach Davidson, following a play where Walker made a tackle on the Bills sideline. In week 11, during a 40–33 loss to the Philadelphia Eagles, Walker scooped up a fumble forced by teammate Rudy Ford on Eagles wide receiver A. J. Brown and returned it 63 yards to put the Packers in scoring position.

Walker was ejected a second time in week 18 against the Detroit Lions after shoving a member of the Lions medical staff, becoming the only player since the 2000 NFL season to be ejected more than once in a single season.

Walker played all 17 games in his rookie campaign, finishing the season with a team-high 121 total tackles (75 solo, 46 assisted). He also recorded a team-high three forced fumbles, as well as 1.5 sacks, five tackles for loss and one fumble recovery.

References

External links
Green Bay Packers bio
Georgia Bulldogs bio

2000 births
Living people
People from Cordele, Georgia
Players of American football from Georgia (U.S. state)
American football linebackers
Georgia Bulldogs football players
Green Bay Packers players